Connor O'Brien may refer to:

Connor O'Brien, King of Thomond (died 1540)
Connor O'Brien, 3rd Earl of Thomond (1534?–1581)
Connor O'Brien, 2nd Viscount Clare (1605–1670)
Connor O'Brien (alpine skier) (born 1961), Canadian alpine skier
Connor O'Brien (footballer) (born 2005), English footballer

See also
Con O'Brien (disambiguation)
Conor O'Brien (disambiguation)
Conor O'Brian (born 1980), American wrestler